The Church of Pakistan is a united Protestant Church in Pakistan; it holds membership in the Anglican Communion, the World Communion of Reformed Churches, and the World Methodist Council.

Establishment of the church
It was established in 1970 with a union of Anglicans (Church of India, Pakistan, Burma and Ceylon), Scottish Presbyterians (Church of Scotland), United Methodists, and Lutherans. It is the only united Protestant Church in South Asia which involves Lutherans.

The church has two theological seminaries: the Gujranwala Theological Seminary and St. Thomas' Theological College, Karachi.

List of Dioceses
 Faisalabad (Bishop: Aleem Anwar Gill)
 Hyderabad (Bishop: Bishop Kaleem John)
 Karachi (Bishop: Frederick John)  
 Lahore (Bishop: Nadeem Kamran)
 Multan (Bishop: Leo Roderick Paul)
 Peshawar (Bishop: Humphrey Peters) 
 Raiwind (Bishop: Azad Marshall) 
 Sialkot (Bishop: Alwin John Samuel)

The Diocese of Sialkot is a member of the World Communion of Reformed Churches. Today, the whole Church of Pakistan is listed as a member on the WCRC website. The Sialkot Diocese has more than 40,400 members in 44 congregations and 28 house fellowships. It adheres to the Apostles Creed, Heidelberg Catechism, Westminster Shorter Catechism and Nicene Creed.

Moderators of the Synod have included Zahir-Ud-Din Mirza, First Bishop of Faisalabad (1990–?). Immediately after the 1970 union, the Church had four dioceses: Multan, Lahore, Sialkot; in 1980, four more were created: Hyderabad, Raiwind, Faisalabad, Peshawar. In 2013, there were eight diocesan bishops plus an area bishop for the Gulf ministries (especially among Urdu-speakers) — an appointment in cooperation with the Diocese of Cyprus and the Gulf, and the Episcopal Church in Jerusalem and the Middle East

Diocese of Raiwind

Diocese of Raiwind is one of the 8 Dioceses of the Church of Pakistan and came into being in 1980, 10 years after the Church Union in which Anglicans, Scottish Presbyterian, Lutherans and the Methodist amalgamated to form the Church of Pakistan. Diocese of Raiwind within its Episcopal jurisdiction comprises the former United Methodist Mission areas and is predominantly rural and semi-urban. The central diocesan office is in Lahore. The Diocesan area stretches out from Warris Road, almost 65 miles South of Lahore. Diocese of Raiwind has more than 26,000 members in 38 congregations and six departments and 11 Schools. The main ministries of the Diocese are Pastoral Care, Village Schools, Sunday School Ministry, Peace Building, Hostel for poor children, Youth Empowerment, Women Empowerment, Special Education.

Relation with the Anglican realignment
The Church of Pakistan is a member of the Global South (Anglican) but not of GAFCON, despite the fact that some bishops already have expressed their support. Moderator and Primate Humphrey Peters, before being elected, attended the Anglican Church in North America meeting of the College of Bishops, in Orlando, Florida, at 6–10 January 2014. Bishop Azad Marshall, of Raiwind, is the leading name of GAFCON in the province, and he attended G19, the additional conference for those who weren't able to attend GAFCON III the previous year, held in Dubai, on 25 February-1 March 2019.

Archbishop Foley Beach, of the Anglican Church in North America, visited Pakistan in November 2019, where he met Moderator Humphrey Peters and Bishop Azad Marshall, of the Church of Pakistan. He also met Muslim scholars during his visit.

See also

Christianity in Pakistan
Christianity in India
Ancient Christianity in the Indian Subcontinent
Church of Pakistan
Diocese of Peshawar
Diocese of Raiwind

References

Bibliography
Linda Greene, World Methodist Council. Handbook of Information 2002–2006, Biltmore Press, Asheville, NC 2002
 The Anglican Communion Official Website.
Church of Pakistan website.
Church of Pakistan at the Anglican Communion Official Website
Diocese of Raiwind website

 
Pakistan
Anglican denominations established in the 20th century
Anglican realignment denominations
Christian denominations in Asia
Christian organisations based in Pakistan
Pakistan
Pakistan
Pakistan
Members of the World Communion of Reformed Churches
Pakistan
Pakistan
Pakistan
Presbyterian denominations established in the 20th century
Pakistan
Christian organizations established in 1970
Pakistan
1970 establishments in Pakistan
Church of India, Burma and Ceylon